Beyblade Burst is a Japanese manga and anime and third incarnation of the series after the Metal saga. It was adapted by OLM and aired on all TXN stations in Japan.

Series overview

Episode list

Beyblade Burst (2016–17)

Beyblade Burst Evolution (2017–18)

Beyblade Burst Turbo (2018–19)

Beyblade Burst Rise (2019–2020)

Beyblade Burst Surge episode (2020–21)

Beyblade Burst QuadDrive (2021–22)

References

Burst series
Beyblade Burst